Felixton is a town in King Cetshwayo District Municipality in the KwaZulu-Natal province of South Africa.

Village 10 km south-east of Empangeni, first settled in 1907. Said to have been named either after Viscount Herbert John Gladstone, nicknamed Felix, or after a local pioneer, Felix Piccione. The local sugar mill is one of the largest in country.

Sources 
 Erasmus, B.P.J.: Op Pad in Suid-Afrika. 1995. 
 Rosenthal, Eric: 'Ensiklopedie van Suidelike Afrika. 1967

References

Populated places in the uMhlathuze Local Municipality
Populated places established in 1907